Grape Creek is a tributary of the Arkansas River that flows through Custer and Fremont counties in South-Central Colorado. The creek drains much of the Wet Mountain Valley, located between the Sangre de Cristo Mountains and the Wet Mountains in Custer County.

Course
The creek rises in the Sangre de Cristo Mountains near Blueberry Mountain. From there, it descends down the east side of the Sangre de Cristos to the Wet Mountain Valley and then flows northwards towards the town of Westcliffe. North of the town, it crosses under Highway 69 and heads northeast, where it is impounded by DeWeese Reservoir. 

Leaving the reservoir, the creek flows generally north down a rocky and remote canyon, eventually emptying into the Arkansas River just west of Cañon City.

Public lands

After it leaves the DeWeese Reservoir, the creek passes through a canyon owned by the BLM, which has classified  of the river canyon as an area of critical environmental concern.

The creek also passes through a small portion of the San Isabel National Forest.

Next, the creek passes through two parcels of land owned by the State of Colorado and managed by Colorado Parks and Wildlife. This State Trust Land is located in Fremont County and offers hunting, fishing, and wildlife viewing.

Finally, the creek is the centerpiece of the  Temple Canyon Park, owned and managed by the city of Cañon City. The park is located near the river's end, before it merges with the Arkansas.

See also
List of rivers of Colorado

References

External links
 Temple Canyon Park map
 Grape Creek State Trust Lands map

Rivers of Fremont County, Colorado
Rivers of Custer County, Colorado
Protected areas of Custer County, Colorado
Protected areas of Fremont County, Colorado